Homag-e Bala (also Romanized as Homāg-e Bālā; also known as Homāk, Homāy, Homā-ye Bālā, Homay Olya, and Mīrū) is a village in Siyahu Rural District, Fin District, Bandar Abbas County, Hormozgan Province, Iran. At the 2006 census, its population was 202, in 68 families.

References 

Populated places in Bandar Abbas County